The following is a list of massacres that have occurred in Spain (numbers may be approximate):

Ancient history

Germanic Kingdoms

Reconquista

Habsburg Spain

Bourbon Spain (1701–1808)

Independence War, Kingdom of Spain and First Republic (1808–1875)

Restoration (1875–1931)

Second Republic (1931–1936)

Civil War (1936–1939)

Francoism (1939–1975)

Transition (1975–1982)

Contemporary Spain (1982–)

References 

Spain
Massacres

Massacres